The Utile was a  56-gun Bordelois-class ship of the line of the French Navy. She was funded by a don des vaisseaux donation from the States of Flander, and built by engineer Léon Guignace on a design by Antoine Groignard. Completed too late to serve in the Seven Years' War, she served in the Mediterranean before becoming a junk in Rochefort.

Career
From April to October 1765, Utile campaigned under Captain Duchaffault against privateers off Morocco. She took part in the 1765 Bombardment of Salé and in the Bombardment of Larache.

From 1772, she was reduced to a hulk in Rochfort and used as a masting machine. She was eventually broken up around 1793.

Notes and references

Notes

References 

Ships of the line of the French Navy
1764 ships
Don des vaisseaux
Bordelois-class ships of the line